Mangalore taluk is a taluk (subdistrict) in the Dakshina Kannada district, Karnataka on the western coast of India. Mangalore is the administrative headquarters of the taluk. It is made up of Mangalore City Corporation, Ullal City Municipality that govern the Mangalore Urban Agglomeration, Other than these there are forty-nine panchayat villages  in Mangalore taluk. Mangalore, Ullal and Moodabidri are the top  3 highly populated towns.

See also 
 Economy of Mangalore
 Swami Vivekananda Planetarium

References

External links
 
 

Geography of Mangalore
Villages in Dakshina Kannada district
Taluks of Karnataka